The 1979 Spanish local elections were held on Tuesday, 3 April 1979, to elect all 67,505 councillors in the 7,870 municipalities of Spain and all 1,152 seats in 43 provincial deputations. The elections were held simultaneously with local elections in the four foral deputations of the Basque Country and Navarre and the ten island councils in the Balearic and Canary Islands.

While the national ruling Union of the Democratic Centre (UCD) emerged as the largest party overall, an alliance between the Spanish Socialist Workers' Party (PSOE) and the Communist Party of Spain (PCE) saw  municipal control over the main urban areas switching to left-wing parties.

Electoral system
Municipal elections
Municipalities in Spain were local corporations with independent legal personality. They had a governing body, the municipal council or corporation, composed of a mayor, deputy mayors and a plenary assembly of councillors. Voting for the local assemblies was on the basis of universal suffrage, with all nationals over eighteen, registered in the corresponding municipality and in full enjoyment of all political rights entitled to vote. The mayor was in turn elected by the plenary assembly, with a legal clause providing for the candidate of the most-voted party to be automatically elected to the post in the event no other candidate was to gather an absolute majority of votes.

Local councillors were elected using the D'Hondt method and a closed list proportional representation, with an electoral threshold of five percent of valid votes—which included blank ballots—being applied in each local council. Councillors were allocated to municipal councils based on the following scale:

Additionally, municipalities below 25 inhabitants, as well as those having traditionally adopted it, were to be organized through the open council system, in which electors would directly vote for the local major.

The electoral law provided that parties, federations, coalitions and groupings of electors were allowed to present lists of candidates. However, groupings of electors were required to secure the signature of at least 0.1 percent of the electors registered in the municipality for which they sought election—needing to secure, in any case, the signature of 500 electors—. Electors were barred from signing for more than one list of candidates. Concurrently, parties and federations intending to enter in coalition to take part jointly at an election were required to inform the relevant Electoral Commission within ten days of the election being called.

Deputations and island councils
Provincial deputations were the governing bodies of provinces in Spain, having an administration role of municipal activities and composed of a provincial president, an administrative body, and a plenary. Basque provinces and Navarre had foral deputations instead—called Juntas Generales in the Basque Country—. For insular provinces, such as the Balearic and Canary Islands, deputations were replaced by island councils in each of the islands or group of islands. For Majorca, Menorca and Ibiza–Formentera this figure was referred to in Spanish as consejo insular, whereas for Gran Canaria, Tenerife, Fuerteventura, La Gomera, El Hierro, Lanzarote and La Palma its name was cabildo insular.

Most deputations were indirectly elected by local councillors from municipalities in each judicial district. Seats were allocated to provincial deputations based on the following scale:

Island councils and the foral deputations of Biscay, Gipuzkoa and Navarre were elected directly by electors under their own, specific electoral regulations.

Municipal elections

Overall

City control
The following table lists party control in provincial capitals, as well as in municipalities above or around 75,000.

Provincial deputations

Summary

Deputation control
The following table lists party control in provincial deputations.

References

1979